Braceface is an animated television series that originally aired on Teletoon in Canada and Fox Family/ABC Family  and Disney Channel in the U.S.

Series overview

Episodes

Season  1 (2001–02)

Season 2 (2002–03)

Season 3 (2003–04)

References

 Lists of Canadian children's animated television series episodes
Lists of Chinese animated television series episodes